Elf Aquitaine is a French brand of oils and other motor products (such as brake fluids) for automobiles and trucks. Elf is a former petroleum company which merged with TotalFina to form "TotalFinaElf". The new company changed its name to Total in 2003 and TotalEnergies in 2021. Elf has been as a major brand of TotalEnergies since then.

History

Founding and mergers (1965-1993)
Elf Aquitaine's heritage is rooted among three French oil companies: Régie Autonome des Pétroles (RAP), Société Nationale des Pétroles d'Aquitaine (SNPA), and Bureau de Recherches de Pétroles (BRP). These companies were formed to exploit the discovery of a gas field in Saint-Marcet in the Aquitaine region of south-western France.
In December 1965, RAP and BRP were merged to form Entreprise de Recherches et d'Activités Pétrolières (ERAP). ERAP had SNPA, Union Générale des Pétroles (UGP), and Union Industrielle des Pétroles (UIP) as subsidiaries. The resulting company achieved vertical integration, owning assets in all phases of the petrol business from exploration and production to the filling station.

On April 28, 1967, the company's disparate brands and products were unified under the Elf brand, Essence Lubricants France. Elf was the first company to pioneer a completely synthetic racing oil.

In 1973, the subsidiary SNPA set up a pharmaceuticals subsidiary called Sanofi and acquired the pharmaceutical groups Labaz, Castaigne, and Robilliart, and also bought interests in a cosmetics company. In 1976, Elf-ERAP merged with Antar Pétroles de l'Atlantique and became Société Nationale Elf Aquitaine (SNEA), later Elf Aquitaine.

Hoax and merger (1979-1981)
Elf Aquitaine lost over US$150 million in the 1979 Great Oil Sniffer Hoax to develop a new "gravity wave-based oil detection system", which was later revealed to be a scam.

In 1981, Elf Aquitaine bought Texasgulf for $3 billion, despite a request by the US government to postpone the merger for time to study the implications. At the time, Texasgulf was the largest producer of sulphur in the world, with Elf Aquitaine gaining majority control. Texasgulf was over one-third owned by the government of Canada. Elf Aquitaine was listed on the NYSE in 1991. In 1993, Elf was awarded the exclusive contract to the Iraqi oil fields by Iraqi leader Saddam al-Tikriti.

Fraud scandal (1994) 
The Elf scandal which came to light in 1994 in France was according to The Guardian, 'the biggest fraud inquiry in Europe since the Second World War... Elf became a private bank for executives who spent £200 million on political favours, mistresses, jewellery, fine art, villas and apartments'.
Iraqi-born Nadhmi Auchi, at that time rumoured to be among the ten richest men in Britain, received a 15-month suspended sentence and a £1.5m fine for his involvement taking illegal commissions. Auchi was also linked to the Clearstream scandal. He is BNP Paribas bank's main private share-holder; and until 2001, the money for the Oil-for-Food programme transited through the escrow account of BNP Paribas. Magistrate Eva Joly investigated the case.
In the Leuna/Minol deal following German reunification, Elf Aquitaine took over circa 2,500 vacated gas station allottments in the former East Germany without paying the rightful owners.

Merger and Total S.A. (1996-2022)
In 1996, the French government sold its stake, retaining a golden share. In 2000, Elf Aquitaine merged with Total Fina to form TotalFinaElf, which changed its name to Total in 2003.

Legal investigations into the company continued after it was purchased by Totalfina.

Automobile and motorcycle partnerships
Elf Aquitaine is an official recommended fuel and motor oil for all Renault-Nissan-Mitsubishi Alliance marques (including Renault (shared with BP, Aral, and Castrol), Nissan, Dacia, Datsun, Alpine, Renault Samsung Motors, and Infiniti), Honda (including Acura shared with BP, Aral, and Castrol), and Brough Superior for automobiles only as well as Kawasaki and Honda for motorcycles only.

Motorsports

From its very beginnings Elf used motor racing as a means of promotion. It began with a four-year association with Matra in a French Formula Three program. This resulted in Henri Pescarolo winning the title. The European Formula Two Championship fell to Matra the following year with Jean-Pierre Beltoise. In 1969, the combination won the Formula One World Championship with Tyrrell and Jackie Stewart.

The goal of winning the Le Mans 24 Hours was not achieved until 1972, by which time Elf and Matra had gone their separate ways. Elf, at that time owned by France, then undertook a policy to rebuild and promote French motor racing. began a long-term relationship with Renault, which was also owned by the French government at the time. Renault promoted the use of Elf oils in its road cars, while its Formula One racing cars also carried Elf sponsorship. This changed in 2009, when the Renault Formula One cars replaced the Elf logos with Total logos.

The most famous of the schemes to promote young drivers dates back to the start of the 1970s, when Francois Guiter of Elf established what was known as the Volant Elf. The fastest drivers on each course at the Winfield Racing Schools, Magny Cours and Paul Ricard, were asked to return to the school in the autumn to establish the fastest driver of the year. The two winners were each given a full budget to race the following year in Formula Renault. If they were fast enough they would be retained by Elf in Formula Three and then Formula Two (or later Formula 3000), and eventually they would get a drive in Formula One. The first two Pilotes Elf were Patrick Tambay and Didier Pironi. Both went on to win Grands Prix. 
 They were followed over the years by Alain Prost, Pascal Fabre, Olivier Grouillard, Paul Belmondo, Éric Bernard, Érik Comas and Olivier Panis, all of whom became Formula One drivers. In addition, Elf often picked up other good drivers and sponsored them, creating a generation of top French drivers in the 1980s and early 1990s.

When Guiter retired Elf decided to change the policy and a revised program was implemented. This aimed to create a scheme for drivers, mechanics and engineers. Called "La Filière;" it funded as many as eight drivers each year in Formula Renault Elf Campus and four in Formula Three. Budget cuts between 2008 and 2012 reduced the number of French drivers moving on to Formula One positions.

Elf also supplying fuels and lubricants for two Formula One junior feeder open-wheel single-seater formula auto racing tournaments GP2 Series (later rebranded as FIA Formula 2 Championship in 2017) since 2005 and GP3 Series since 2010 (later rebranded as FIA Formula 3 Championship in 2019) respectively due to in fact Mecachrome has a long-term technical partnership with Elf since 1969.

Elf also supplying standard Ethanol E10 fuels for all SRO-owned GT championships.

See also

References

External links

 

Petroleum products
Motor oils
Oil companies of France
Chemical companies of France
French brands
TotalEnergies
Privatized companies of France
Defunct companies of France
Companies formerly listed on the Paris Bourse
Companies formerly listed on the New York Stock Exchange
2000 mergers and acquisitions
Companies based in Île-de-France
Hauts-de-Seine

fi:Elf Aquitaine